This list of theatrical animated feature films consists of animated films produced or released by Lionsgate.

Lionsgate releases films from Lionsgate-owned and non-Lionsgate owned animation studios. Most films listed below are from Splash Entertainment which distributed animated films for Lionsgate, producing its first feature-length animated film Norm of the North in 2016. Lionsgate has also released animated films by other production companies, such as Aardman Animations.

Films

US releases

Highest grossing films

References

Notes

American animated films
Lionsgate animated films
Lists of animated films
Lists of American animated films